Primocerioides is a genus of hoverfly.

Systematics
Species include:
Primocerioides beijingensis Yang & Cheng, 1999
Primocerioides petri Hervé-Bazin, 1914
Primocerioides regale Violovitsh, 1985

References

Hoverfly genera
Eristalinae
Taxa named by Raymond Corbett Shannon